District 30 of the Texas Senate is a senatorial district that currently serves all of Archer, Clay, Cooke, Erath, Grayson, Jack, Montague, Palo Pinto, Parker, Wichita, Wise and Young counties, and portions of Collin and Denton counties in the U.S. state of Texas.

The District is currently represented by Drew Springer who took office in early January, 2021, replacing Pat Fallon.

Top 5 biggest cities in district
District 30 has a population of 829,574 with 623,474 that are at voting age from the 2010 census.

Election history
Election history of District 30 from 1992.

Previous elections

2020

2018
Pat Fallon defeated incumbent Craig Estes  in the 2018 Republican primary.

2014

2012

2008

2004

2002

2001

1998

1994

1992

District officeholders

Notes

References

30
Archer County, Texas
Clay County, Texas
Collin County, Texas
Cooke County, Texas
Denton County, Texas
Erath County, Texas
Grayson County, Texas
Jack County, Texas
Montague County, Texas
Palo Pinto County, Texas
Parker County, Texas
Wichita County, Texas
Wise County, Texas
Young County, Texas